Evolution, Medicine, and Public Health is a peer-reviewed scientific journal published by Oxford University Press for the International Society for Evolution, Medicine, and Public Health. As of 2022, the editor-in-chief is Cynthia Beall (Case Western Reserve University). The journal is abstracted and indexed in Scopus and the Science Citation Index Expanded. According to the Journal Citation Reports, the journal has a 2020 impact factor of 5.425.

References

External links

Public health journals
Oxford University Press academic journals
Publications established in 2013
English-language journals
Evolutionary biology journals